Compsistis bifaciella is a moth of the family Lecithoceridae. It is endemic to New Zealand and found throughout the North Island.

Description 
Dugdale described the larvae of this species as follows:

Distribution 
This species is endemic to New Zealand and found throughout the North Island.

Habitat and hosts 
This species inhabits native forest. Larvae feed on leaf litter, living in a silk gallery either on the ground or in tree ferns. They pupate in a leaf litter coated dome shaped cocoon normally resting on a dead leaf.

Behaviour 
The adults of this species are on the wing from October to January, though occasionally they have also been recorded in February. It is a day flying moth and is difficult to observe when on the wing. Adults tend be active on sunny days and but can be observed when settled on vegetation. This species has been collected via sweeping of vegetation and malaise traps.

References

Moths of New Zealand
Endemic fauna of New Zealand
Moths described in 1864
Lecithoceridae
Taxa named by Francis Walker (entomologist)
Endemic moths of New Zealand